The 2018–19 Belarusian Premier League season is the 27th season of the top tier basketball league in Belarus.

Competition format
Ten teams joined the regular season, that consisted in a four-legged round-robin competition, later dividing all the teams into two groups. The six teams of the Group A and the two best of the Group B joined the playoffs.

Regular season

Standings

Results

Second stage

Group A

Standings

Results

Group B

Standings

Results

Playoffs
Quarterfinals will be played in a best-of-three games format and the rest of series in a 2-2-1 format.

Bracket

Quarter-finals

|}

Semi-finals

|}

Third-place series

|}

Finals

|}

5th to 8th place playoffs

Bracket

Semifinals

|}

Seventh-place series

|}

Fifth-place series

|}

Belarusian clubs in European competitions

References

External links 
Belarusian Basketball Federation

Belarusian Premier League (basketball) seasons
Belarus
Premier League